Dance permit is a permit required for dancing.

Dance permit in Sweden 
Since the 1930s a dance permit ("danstillstånd") is required for public dance events in Sweden per the law of order (2 kap. 4 § ordningslagen 1993:1617).

Filing for a dance permit is associated with a fee of 700 SEK (2014) for the establishment. The police may take photographs and films of patrons moving in sync with the music in a dance like way. These photos and films may later be used as evidence of a crime if the establishment is lacking the required permit.

In 2016, the Riksdag (the national legislature and the supreme decision-making body of Sweden) voted unanimously to abolish the requirement for a dance permit but the law still exists and is enforced.

See also 
Dancing ban

References 

Permit
Law of Sweden